This is a list of tourist attractions in and around Silicon Valley, it includes parts or most of Santa Clara County, San Mateo County, and Alameda County.

Arboreta and gardens

Arizona Cactus Garden, Stanford University
Chinese Cultural Garden, San Jose
Emma Prusch Farm Park, San Jose
Filoli Estate, Woodside
Gamble Gardens, Palo Alto
Hakone Gardens, Saratoga
Japanese Friendship Garden, at Kelley Park, San Jose
Overfelt Gardens, East San Jose
San Jose Municipal Rose Garden, downtown San Jose
San Mateo Japanese Tea Garden, Central Park, San Mateo, designed by Nagao Sakurai.
Stanford University Arboretum, Stanford University
Villa Montalvo Arboretum, Saratoga

Cultural

Art 
This is a list of Silicon Valley art museums and art collectives/cooperatives.
 New Museum Los Gatos, Los Gatos
 The Anderson Collection, at Stanford University, Stanford
 Allied Arts Guild, Menlo Park
 De Saisset Museum, at Santa Clara University, Santa Clara
 Iris & B. Gerald Cantor Center for Visual Arts at Stanford University, Stanford
 The Lace Museum, Sunnyvale
 Pacific Art League, Palo Alto
 Palo Alto Art Center, Palo Alto
 San Jose Museum of Art, downtown San Jose
 San Jose Museum of Quilts & Textiles, San Jose
 The Foster Museum, Palo Alto
 Triton Museum of Art, Santa Clara
Montalvo Arts Center, Saratoga, California

Dance 
 Ballet San Jose, downtown San Jose (closed 2018)
 sjDANCEco, downtown San Jose

Estate 
 Emma Prusch Farm Park, San Jose
 Filoli Estate, Woodside
 Gamble Gardens, Palo Alto
 Rengstorff House, Mountain View
 Villa Montalvo, Saratoga
Winchester Mystery House, West San Jose

Faith-based 

Cathedral Basilica of St. Joseph, downtown San Jose
Five Wounds Portuguese National Church, Little Portugal, San Jose
Gurdwara Sahib of San Jose, East San Jose
Stanford Memorial Church, at Stanford University

Historical 
Burlingame Museum of PEZ Memorabilia, Burlingame
Circle of Palms Plaza, downtown San Jose
De Anza Hotel, downtown San Jose
Forbes Mill, Los Gatos
Hangar One, Mountain View
Hiller Aviation Museum, San Carlos
History Park at Kelley Park, Willow Glen (south-central San Jose)
Japanese American Museum of San Jose, San Jose
Little Italy San Jose, San Jose
Mexican Heritage Plaza, East San Jose
Museum of American Heritage, Palo Alto
New Almaden, Quicksilver Mining Museum
The HP Garage, Palo Alto
Los Altos History Museum, Los Altos
Peralta Adobe, downtown San Jose
Portuguese Historical Museum, East San Jose
Viet Museum, East San Jose
Rosicrucian Egyptian Museum, downtown San Jose
San Mateo County History Museum, downtown Redwood City
San Jose Museum of Quilts & Textiles, downtown San Jose
Sunnyvale Heritage Park Museum, Sunnyvale
Winchester Mystery House, West San Jose

Music 
 Choral Project, downtown San Jose
 Fox Theatre, Redwood City
 Ira F. Brilliant Center for Beethoven Studies, downtown San Jose
 Opera San Jose, downtown San Jose
 Symphony Silicon Valley, downtown San Jose
 Vivace Youth Chorus of San Jose, San Jose

Theatre 
 Broadway by the Bay, Redwood City
 City Lights Theater Company of San Jose, San Jose
 Hillbarn Theatre, Foster City
 Los Altos Stage Company, Los Altos
 Montgomery Theater, San Jose
 Palo Alto Players Theatre Company, Palo Alto
 Pear Theatre, Mountain View
 Portola Valley Theatre Conservatory, Portola Valley
 Ram's Head Theatrical Society, Stanford University
 San Jose Center for the Performing Arts, downtown San Jose
 San Jose Improv, downtown San Jose
 San Jose Repertory Theatre, downtown San Jose
 San Jose Stage Company, San Jose
 Sierra Repertory Theatre, San Jose
 Sunnyvale Community Players, Sunnyvale
 Tabard Theatre Company, San Jose
 TheatreWorks Theatre Company, Palo Alto and Mountain View

Children's Theatre 
 Children's Musical Theatre San Jose, San Jose
 Palo Alto Children's Theatre Company, Palo Alto
 Peninsula Youth Theatre, Mountain View
 Pied Piper Players, San Mateo
 Roberta Jones Junior Theatre, Santa Clara
 San Carlos Children's Theater, San Carlos
 Silicon Valley Children's Musical Theater, San Jose
 Willow Glen Children's Theatre, San Jose

Other 
Dr. Martin Luther King, Jr. Library, downtown San Jose
San Jose City Hall, downtown San Jose
San Jose Flea Market, Berryessa (northeast San Jose)

Event venues

This is a list of larger event venues.
PayPal Park, San Jose
Buck Shaw Stadium, Santa Clara
California Theatre, downtown San Jose
City National Civic Events, San Jose
Event Center Arena, downtown San Jose
The Flint Center for the Performing Arts, Cupertino
Levi's Stadium, Santa Clara 
Lucie Stern Theater, Palo Alto 
Montgomery Theater, San Jose 
San Jose Center for the Performing Arts, downtown San Jose
San Jose Civic Auditorium, downtown San Jose
San Jose Convention Center, downtown San Jose
San Jose Municipal Stadium, downtown San Jose
San Jose Repertory Theatre, downtown San Jose
Santa Clara Convention Center, Santa Clara
SAP Center at San Jose, downtown San Jose
Shoreline Amphitheatre, Mountain View
Spartan Stadium, downtown San Jose
Stanford Stadium, Stanford

Events

BayCon, Santa Clara
Christmas in the Park, downtown San Jose
Cinequest Film Festival, multiple venues
FanimeCon, downtown San Jose
Los Altos Art and Wine Festival, Los Altos
Mountain View Art and Wine Festival, Mountain View
Palo Alto Festival of the Arts, Palo Alto
San Francisco International Asian American Film Festival, downtown San Jose
San Jose Bike Party, monthly bicycle ride in San Jose area, different route each time
San Jose Jazz Festival, downtown San Jose
Stanford Jazz Festival, Stanford University

Parks and trails

Almaden Lake Park, South San Jose
Almaden Quicksilver County Park, South San Jose
Alum Rock Park, East San Jose
Bay Area Ridge Trail, surrounds and crosses the valley
Belgatos Park and connected Heintz, and Santa Rosa open space preserves, Los Gatos
Big Basin Redwoods State Park, Santa Cruz Mountains
Castle Rock State Park, Santa Cruz Mountains
Coyote Creek Trail, San Jose to Morgan Hill
Ed R. Levin County Park, Milpitas
Fremont Older Open Space Preserve, Saratoga
Grant Ranch Park, East San Jose/Mount Hamilton
Guadalupe River Trail, downtown San Jose, Willow Glen and South San Jose
Henry Cowell Redwoods State Park, Santa Cruz Mountains
Kelley Park, Willow Glen (south-central San Jose)
Lake Cunningham, East San Jose
Los Alamitos Creek Trail, South San Jose
Los Gatos Creek Trail, West San Jose, Campbell and Los Gatos
Mission Peak, Fremont, California
Plaza de César Chávez, downtown San Jose
Rancho San Antonio Open Space Preserve, Santa Cruz Mountains
Rosicrucian Park, downtown San Jose
San Francisco Bay Trail, Palo Alto, Mountain View, Sunnyvale, Santa Clara, San Jose and Milpitas
Sanborn Park, Saratoga and Santa Cruz Mountains
Santa Teresa County Park, South San Jose
Shoreline Park, Mountain View, Mountain View
Stevens Creek Trail, Cupertino, Sunnyvale and Mountain View
Uvas Canyon County Park, west of Morgan Hill
Vasona Park, Los Gatos
Villa Montalvo Arboretum, Saratoga

See additional parks, hiking trails, and open space preserves at: Santa Clara County Parks and Recreation Department, Midpeninsula Regional Open Space District

Science, technology and education

Children's Discovery Museum of San Jose, downtown San Jose
Computer History Museum, Mountain View
CuriOdyssey,  Coyote Point Recreation Area, San Mateo
DeAnza College Fujitsu Planetarium, Cupertino
EcoCenter, Palo Alto Baylands, Palo Alto
Lick Observatory, Mount Hamilton, San Jose
Museum of American Heritage, Palo Alto
NASA Ames Exploration Center, Mountain View
Palo Alto Junior Museum and Zoo, Palo Alto
San Jose electric light tower (model, in History Park at Kelley Park, San Jose)
San Jose State University, downtown San Jose
Santa Clara University, Santa Clara
Stanford University, Stanford
The Tech Interactive, formerly The Tech Museum of Innovation, downtown San Jose

Technology campuses 
 Apple Park, Cupertino
Facebook headquarters, Menlo Park
 Googleplex, Mountain View
Intel Museum, Intel campus, Santa Clara

Shopping
Eastridge Center, East San Jose
Great Mall of the Bay Area, Milpitas
Hillsdale Shopping Center, San Mateo
Pruneyard Shopping Center, Campbell
San Antonio Shopping Center, Mountain View
Santana Row, West San Jose
Stanford Shopping Center, Palo Alto
Westfield Oakridge, South San Jose
Westfield Valley Fair, West San Jose
Westgate Mall, West San Jose

Theme parks and tours

Billy Jones Wildcat Railroad, Los Gatos
California's Great America, Santa Clara (formerly "Paramount's Great America")
Gilroy Gardens, Gilroy (formerly "Bonfante Gardens")
Happy Hollow Park & Zoo, Willow Glen (south-central San Jose)
Raging Waters, East San Jose
Roaring Camp & Big Trees Narrow Gauge Railroad, Santa Cruz Mountains

Vineyards and wineries

Byington Vineyard, Los Gatos
David Bruce Winery, Los Gatos
J. Lohr Vineyards and Wines, downtown San Jose
Mountain Winery, Saratoga
Picchetti Brothers Winery, Cupertino
Rabbits Foot Meadery, Sunnyvale
Savannah-Chanelle Vineyards, Saratoga

See also
 List of museums in the San Francisco Bay Area
 National Register of Historic Places listings in Santa Clara County, California
 Silicon Valley

References

External links 

Things to do at City of San Jose
Activities at San Jose/Silicon Valley Convention & Visitors Bureau
List of attractions at SanJose.com
List of events at San Jose Mercury News
Nasa Ames Research Center/Moffett Field Tours
Moffett Field Museum and Tours
Japanese American Museum of San Jose and Tours

Silicon Valley
 
Silicon Valley